Zedi Ramadani  (born 22 April 1985) is a Croatian retired football player of Albanian descent.

Career
Ramadani previously played for NK Varteks, NK Pula, NK Rijeka and NK Croatia Sesvete of the Croatian Prva HNL. A former u-21 national football team player, his professional career was crippled by a mysterious illness which turned out to be a brain tumor, which was operated on in May 2009. Recovering from the disease, he returned to playing lower league football, hoping to play in the Prva HNL again one day.

Personal life
He has ethnic Albanian ancestry from North Macedonia, namely Tetovo.

References

1985 births
Living people
Sportspeople from Pula
Croatian people of Albanian descent
Croatian people of Macedonian descent
Association football midfielders
Croatian footballers
Croatia youth international footballers
Croatia under-21 international footballers
Croatian Muslims
NK Varaždin players
NK Istra 1961 players
HNK Rijeka players
NK Croatia Sesvete players
HNK Segesta players
Croatian Football League players